Normétal is a municipality in northwestern Quebec, Canada, in the Abitibi-Ouest Regional County Municipality. It had a population of 778 in the 2021 Canadian census.

History
In 1923, zinc and copper was discovered near the Calamité River and two years later, the Abana Mine Company obtained the mining rights. The new settlement, formed by families from Saint-Eustache, Portneuf, Bellechasse and the Mauricie, was therefore first called Abana. In 1931, the Normetal Mining Corporation acquired the mine and brought it to full operation six years later. In 1939, the railway and road to Dupuy was completed. In 1945, the place was incorporated, taking the name of the mining corporation whose name in turn is a portmanteau for "northern" and "metal".

In 1949, street lighting was installed in Normétal. In 1950, the mining corporation came under control of Noranda (which became Falconbridge Ltd. and bought by Xstrata in 2006). In 1956, the mine had a peak production of 900 tons of ore per day and employed over 600 persons. In 1961, the town reached a population of 2519, its largest number of residents. By the following year, the population had dropped to 1455.

The Normetmar Mine closed in 1990. In 2005, work began on rehabilitation of the mine site by removing the tailings and planting vegetation.

Demographics

Population

Language

Municipal council
 Mayor: Roger Lévesque
 Councillors: Reynald Béland, Léo Gaudreault, Ghislain Desbiens, Monique Bouchard, Karine Naud, Lise Bégin

List of mayors
The former mayors of Normétal were:

 Albert Lafond  1945–47
 Georges Barré  1947–55
 Roméo Morin  1955–56
 Lucien Trottier  1956–61
 Lionel Mayer  1961–63
 Samuel Petitclerc  1963–65, 1975–76
 Régis Comeau  1965–68
 Philippe Doire  1968–75
 Réal Gamache  1976–81
 Maurice Moisan  1981
 André Rivest  1981
 Normand Beaupré  1981–2005
 Daniel Therrien  2005–07
 Jean Bergeron  2007–2010
 Louise Quesnel  2010–2012
 Rachel Bureau 2012-2013
 Jacques Dickey 2013-2017
 Roger Lévesque 2017-2021

Culture
The town of Normétal is the setting of an award-winning movie, The Legacy from filmmaker Bernard Émond (2009), in which a family medicine physician from Montreal takes over the practice of an aging physician in need of respite.

See also
 List of municipalities in Quebec

References

External links

Normétal official website

Municipalities in Quebec
Incorporated places in Abitibi-Témiscamingue
Populated places established in 1925